FN Browning may refer to a number of firearms made by the Belgian manufacturer FN Herstal designed or based on designs by American John Browning:

Handguns

 FN M1900
 FN M1903
 FN M1905
 FN M1910
 Baby Browning
 Browning Hi-Power

Rifles

FN Trombone

Machine Guns

 M1919 Browning
 Mitrailleuse d´Avion Browning - F.N. Calibre 13,2 mm
FN Herstal firearms